Robert Harry Mornement (15 August 1873 – 16 April 1948) was an English cricketer. Mornement was a right-handed batsman who bowled right-arm medium pace.

Mornement first played county cricket in the 1895 Minor Counties Championship for Norfolk club against Hertfordshire. Mornement played a further Minor Counties match for the county in 1896 against the same opposition.

Mornement made his first-class debut for Hampshire in the 1906 County Championship against Yorkshire. Mornement played two further matches for the county in the 1906 season against Warwickshire and Somerset. In his three matches for the county Mornement took 6 wickets at a bowling average of 28.50, with best figures of 3/62.

In 1910 and 1911 Mornement represented the Army and Navy against Oxford and Cambridge Universities, where he scored his maiden and only first-class half century score of 73 in the 1911 fixture. With the ball he took 3 wickets at an average of 29.33, with best figures of 2/25.

Mornement died at Chatham, Kent on 16 April 1948.

External links
Robert Mornement at Cricinfo
Robert Mornement at CricketArchive

1873 births
1948 deaths
People from Breckland District
English cricketers
Norfolk cricketers
Hampshire cricketers
Army and Navy cricketers
Sportspeople from Norfolk